Arena da Amazônia (Amazon Arena) is a football stadium in Manaus, Amazonas, Brazil, located on the former site of the Vivaldão stadium. The stadium has an all-seater capacity of 44,300 and was constructed from 2010 to 2014 as part of Brazil's hosting of the 2014 FIFA World Cup. It hosted matches of the football tournament at the 2016 Summer Olympics. During the World Cup, the arena had a limited maximum-capacity of 40,549.

Design and construction

Built on the site of the old Vivaldo Lima stadium, the Arena da Amazônia is located midway between Manaus International Airport and the historic center of the city. It is also near the Manaus Convention Center and the Amadeu Teixeira Arena. The cost of its construction was split with 25% paid by the Amazonas State Government and 75% by the Brazilian Development Bank.

The stadium was designed by German architecture firm Gerkan, Marg and Partners, with inspiration from the Amazon rainforest that surrounds the city of Manaus and its metallic exterior structure is designed to evoke the straw baskets that are made in the region. It was built by the Brazilian engineering firm Andrade Gutierrez and incorporates several sustainability-friendly features.

The stadium can seat around 44,300 spectators and features a restaurant, luxury suites, underground parking spaces and accessibility for people with special needs. It also includes an on-site rain water recycling system and sewage treatment facilities to reduce its water usage and is designed to make use of natural ventilation to reduce its consumption of energy. In addition, more than 95% of the material from the demolition of the old stadium was recycled.

Because the climate of Manaus is extremely warm due to its location near the equator, the stadium was designed to minimize the temperatures inside the structure with features such as a white, reflective exterior, plentiful shade over the seating areas, and a large amount of ventilation openings in the façade of the building.

Despite these efforts, England manager Roy Hodgson criticized the location of the stadium saying the extreme heat of Manaus makes it difficult for players. England later played its opening game against Italy in Manaus and lost 2–1. The average goals-per-game in Manaus tallied 3.5 goals compared to 2.7 for the total 2014 World Cup matches.

The stadium itself has been criticised for being completely unnecessary beyond the World Cup, because of the small crowds that attend local Football Matches in Manaus and the remote nature of Manaus. The Stadium has seen light use since the World Cup with occasional 4th Division Matches and Christian Evangelical and Guns N' Roses Concerts. The Stadium hosted several men's and women's football matches during the 2016 Olympics and some of Brazil's 2018 FIFA World Cup qualifying matches.

2014 FIFA World Cup
The stadium was still under construction by February 2014, and doubts were raised over whether or not it would have been ready to host the FIFA World Cup.

However, the stadium opened on 9 March 2014 and staged its opening match, a cup game in which Northern Brazilian teams Nacional FC and Clube do Remo participated.

The stadium hosted four games during the World Cup.

Brazil national football team

See also
 Estádio Vivaldo Lima

References

External links 

Stadium Guide Article

Football venues in Amazonas (Brazilian state)
2014 FIFA World Cup stadiums
Arena da Amazonia
Sports venues in Amazonas (Brazilian state)
Arena da Amazonia
Sports venues completed in 2014
Venues of the 2016 Summer Olympics
Olympic football venues
2014 establishments in Brazil